Kabu or KABU may refer to:

Kaabu a 13th-18th century empire in what is today Senegal
Kabu, Syria, a town in Syria
toshiyori kabu (年寄株), a coaching licence in sumo 
 Kabu, the Japanese word for turnip
 Kabu, one of the Gym Leaders in Pokémon Sword and Shield
 KABU, an American radio station
 Kabu (album), a 1991 album by Ethiopian singer Aster Aweke